Hamdi Hobais Sher Jandal Al-Sharjandal (born 27 January 1984), commonly known as Hamdi Hobais, is an Omani football manager and a former footballer who is the current manager of Al-Nasr S.C.S.C. U-19.

Club career statistics

International career

Hamdi was selected for the national team for the first time in 2003. He has made appearances in the qualification for the 2006 FIFA World Cup qualification and the 2004 Asian Cup and has represented the national team in the 2010 FIFA World Cup qualification and the 2014 FIFA World Cup qualification.

Managerial career
Hamdi holds the AFC C License, the fourth highest football coaching qualification in Asian Football Confederation. He began his managerial career just a few months after retiring from club football in 2013. He first began managing the club with whom he began both his youth and professional career, Fanja U-19.

References

External links

Hamdi Hubais at Goal.com

1984 births
Living people
People from Salalah
Omani footballers
Oman international footballers
Omani expatriate footballers
Association football midfielders
2004 AFC Asian Cup players
Al-Nasr SC (Salalah) players
Al-Nasr SC (Kuwait) players
Salalah SC players
Expatriate footballers in Kuwait
Omani expatriate sportspeople in Kuwait
Omani football managers
Kuwait Premier League players